Gary Nichols (born 1978 in Muscle Shoals, Alabama) is an American country music singer. Signed to Mercury Nashville Records in 2006, Nichols made his debut that year with the release of his single "Unbroken Ground", which reached No. 39 on the Billboard Hot Country Songs charts. Following it were the singles "I Can't Love You Anymore" and "Goin' Fast." Nichols never released an album for the label and soon left it.

In April 2010, he replaced Chris Stapleton as the lead singer and guitarist of The SteelDrivers.

After seven successful years and leading the band to win its first Grammy, Gary departed in August 2017. He released a solo album titled "Field Of Plenty" on Merrimack Records the same year. The mostly solo album features Charlie Musselwhite and Spooner Oldham on some tracks.

Discography

Singles

Music videos

Games
2006: The song "Goin' Fast" was featured in NASCAR 07.

References

1978 births
American country singer-songwriters
Living people
People from Muscle Shoals, Alabama
Mercury Records artists
21st-century American singers
Country musicians from Alabama
Singer-songwriters from Alabama